Household total net is the net worth for individuals and is used as a measure in economics to compare the wealth of different groups. The net worth is the value of total assets minus the total value of outstanding liabilities. Household financial net worth is the balancing item of their financial balance sheet recorded at current market values. The total net worth is measured as a percentage of net disposable income. 

The financial net worth is calculated as the ratio of financial net worth of households divided by the number of individuals in the country, in United States dollars at current purchasing power parity.

Top 10 countries with largest household net worth

See also
 High-net-worth individuals
 List of countries by wealth per adult
 National wealth
 Ultra high-net-worth individuals

References

Personal finance